Yakiv Vasilyovich Smolii (born 1 February 1961) is a Ukrainian economist and banker and former Chairman of the National Bank of Ukraine. He was acting Governor of the National Bank from 11 May 2017 (when Valeriia Hontareva resigned) until the Ukrainian parliament elected him Governor on 15 March 2018. Smolii was dismissed by the parliament on 3 July 2020 after he had tendered his resignation, he claimed he had done this as a result of long-standing political pressure.

Early life
Smolii was born on February 1, 1961, in Verbovets, Lanivtsi Raion, Ternopil Oblast.

Education
Smolii received his university education from Lviv University where he graduated with B.Sc in mathematics in 1983. He majored in applied mathematics.

Career 
Since 15 March 2018 — Governor of the National Bank of Ukraine.

Since 11 May 2017 — Acting Governor of the National Bank of Ukraine.

Since 25 October 2016 — First Deputy Governor of the National Bank of Ukraine.

Since 25 April 2014 — Deputy Governor of the National Bank of Ukraine.

2006 –  2014 — Director on Banking Business, Prestige-Group.

2005 – 2006 — Consultant at Office Stolychnyi CJSC and Prestige-Group.

1994 – 2005 — Head of Automation Office, and later — Deputy Chairman of the Board,  Aval Joint Stock Post Pension Bank.

Between 1987 and 1991 Smolii worked as software engineer in private firm Orion, from where he left to work as head if IT division of regional office of National Bank of Ukraine in Ternopil.

Chairman of the National Bank of Ukraine 
From March 15, 2018 — appointed Chairman of the National Bank of Ukraine by the decision of the Verkhovna Rada of Ukraine. 247 deputies of the Verkhovna Rada of Ukraine voted for him.

"The National Bank must continue to be independent of political spectrum. Political independence will allow the National Bank to fulfill its mandate effectively, to ensure price and financial stability." 

Speaking before the Verkhovna Rada, Yakiv Smolii, as Chairman of the National Bank of Ukraine, promised to focus the regulator's attention on:

 maintaining of price financial stability, promotion of economic growth, integration of the Ukrainian financial system into European

"Over the past three years, the National Bank has been able to stabilize the macroeconomic situation, improve the health of the banking system, and introduce such important innovations as inflation targeting and floating exchange rate. The National Bank team will continue to build a modern and open bank of the country that has the trust of the society".

 maintaining and deepening cooperation with our international partners
 continued growth of a modern, sustainable and transparent banking system that can effectively contribute to sustainable economic development:
 resume loan origination to the real economy as soon as possible

"The banking system already has enough money to launch full-fledged credit financing. In total, more than 80 billion UAH can be invested for reviving the country's economy. At the same time, we have several challenges: the critical amount of non-performing loans in the banks’ portfolios and the weak protection of the creditors rights. Their solution is possible only by amending the legislation."

 conduct a thorough monetary liberalization
 work on ensuring a low and stable inflation rate within the period of 5 years in the range of 5 +/- 1%

"We will not allow returning to the domination of fiscal policy over the monetary price of purchasing power of Ukrainians"

 integrate the Ukrainian financial system into all-European system in the medium run, implementing European directives and norms, in accordance with the EU-Ukraine Association Agreement
 financial inclusion, that is, the availability and security of banking services

On March 2, 2018, in the interview for Interfax portal Yakiv Smolii noted that the NBU prepared a renewal of the development strategy of the financial sector of Ukraine (in particular, for the time period 2020–2025). In addition, for the first time, a strategy of the National Bank of Ukraine was developed. It sets goals for the regulator in the medium run. The NBU has set 7 target benchmarks: the NBU plans to focus on resuming loan origination and a smooth transition to free capital movement in addition to the mandate, determined by the law on the NBU, to support low and stable inflation and ensure the stability and efficiency of the banking system. New tasks were also defined: ensuring the effective regulation of the entire financial sector and the development of financial inclusion.

Y. Smolii also noted that the NBU plans to join several modern trends of financial digitalization, among which:

Cashless economy — transfer of most payments to non-cash form:

 movement towards European standards, implementation of the Payment Services Directive 2 (PSD2): new forms of financial documents and transactions that can be realized in Ukrainian SEP3;
 introduction of Instant payments - fast transfers with a guarantee from the payer to the recipient 24/7/365. P2P services on     the new stage of the Ukrainian System of Electronic Payments (SEP4);
 implementation of "electronic hryvnia" - cash in electronic form (equivalent of fiat currency, which will be exchanged at the rate of 1:1 for cash or cashless equivalent), instant transactions with mobile; 
 reduction of resources for the production and maintenance of cash through transferring it to non-cash form;
 transfer of cash for maintenance (storage) from the NBU to the commercial sector;

Cybersecurity 

 building of NBU data processing center, which will be able to provide backup and information storage services to other government agencies;
 building of NBU Cash Center in the West of Ukraine - a modern cash unit for storing and processing cash.

Dismissal as Chairman of the National Bank of Ukraine 
Smolii was dismissed by the Ukrainian parliament on 3 July 2020 after he had tendered his resignation two days earlier. He claimed he had tendered his resignation because of long-standing political pressure. Before the vote Smolii addressed parliament and stated that he had "made a difficult but necessary decision to resign" because according  to him the National Bank had "been under systematic political pressure for a long time. Pressure to approve decisions that are not economically sound, that focus on short-term simple victories and can cost the Ukrainian economy and Ukraine in the longer term". Smolii claimed this pressure was "paid rallies, pressure through the courts, information attacks and unfounded political assessments." He didn't explicitly state pressure from individual politicians but claimed that "at all meetings where the president, people's deputies or the prime minister were present the National Bank was asked to flood the economy with money and to cancel sound principles of regulation."

Advisor to Ukrainian President Volodymyr Zelensky on Economics Oleh Ustenko denied that Smolii had been pressured but that the National Bank had an outdated communication policy "when it seems that you explain, but you explain only when you want to."

Member of the National Security and Defense Council of Ukraine 
On March 28, 2018, he was appointed a member of the National Security and Defense Council of Ukraine by a decree of the President of Ukraine.

Degree 

PhD in Economics

References

Governors of the National Bank of Ukraine
1961 births
Living people
People from Ternopil Oblast
Ukrainian bankers
University of Lviv alumni
National Security and Defense Council of Ukraine
Recipients of the Honorary Diploma of the Cabinet of Ministers of Ukraine